James Lithgow may refer to:

James S. Lithgow (1812–1902), mayor of Louisville, Kentucky
Sir James Lithgow, 1st Baronet (1883–1952), Scottish industrialist